Howth is a locality and small rural community in the local government area of Central Coast, in the North West region of Tasmania. Bass Strait forms part of the northern boundary of the locality. The 2016 census determined a population of 54 for the state suburb of Howth.

History
The locality was named in 1900 for Howth, a village and outer suburb of Dublin in Ireland, the home town of an early settler family.

Road infrastructure
The C118 route (Nine Mile Road) intersects with the Bass Highway at the north-eastern extremity of the locality, from where it runs through to the south and provides access to many other localities.

References

Localities of Central Coast Council (Tasmania)
Towns in Tasmania